Kirk Winterrowd is an American video game music composer and musician, best known for his work for Origin Systems, namely several of the Ultima titles. He also served as a voice actor in Ultima VIII: Pagan.

Discography
 Ultima VII: The Black Gate (1992)
 Ultima VII, Part 2: Serpent Isle (1993)
 Strike Commander (1993)
 Wing Commander: Academy (1993)
 Ultima VIII: Pagan (1994)
 Wing Commander: Armada (1994)
 BioForge (1995)
 Crusader: No Remorse (1995)
 Ultima Online (1997) - (in collaboration with Joe Basquez)
 Ares Rising (1998)

References

External links
 

Year of birth missing (living people)
Living people
American male composers
21st-century American composers
21st-century American male musicians